Pulsus Group is a health informatics and digital marketing company and publisher of scientific, technical, and medical literature. It was formed in 1984, primarily to publish peer-reviewed medical journals. , Pulsus published 98 hybrid and full open-access journals, 15 of which had been adopted as the official publications of related medical societies. Pulsus Group also conducts conferences in association with scientific societies.

OMICS Publishing Group, an open access publisher widely regarded as predatory, purchased Pulsus in 2016, causing controversy and putting the future of the journals into question. The company has been placed on Jeffrey Beall's list of "Potential, possible, or probable" predatory open-access publishers.

History
The company was founded in 1984 by Robert Kalina to provide Canadian doctors with an alternative to American journals. In December 2015, Pulsus sold four of its journals to the open access publisher Hindawi Publishing Corporation. In 2016, Pulsus was bought by OMICS Publishing Group, an open access publisher widely regarded as predatory, causing controversy and putting the future of the journals into question. Kalina, the owner of Pulsus Group was retiring but could not find buyers for Pulsus Group's remaining journals, but claimed that the sale negotiated with OMICS would continue to protect the interests of the societies that own the journals. Since the takeover by OMICS, several editors-in-chief have resigned and a number of societies have decided to take their journals to a different publisher. The CEO of OMICS has promised that the journals published by Pulsus will be run independently by the respective societies that they belong to, with OMICS only providing hosting, PDF formatting, and design. Nonetheless, Jeffrey Beall added Pulsus Group to his list of "Potential, possible, or probable" predatory open-access publishers.

Acquisitions
In September 2016, Pulsus Group acquired another Canadian publisher, Andrew John Publishing, including 17 medical journals associated with medical societies of the Middle East and Canada, and some journals from the London based Future Science Publishing Group operating as Openaccessjournals.com.

Predatory behavior
In 2019 it was reported that Pulsus journals were listing on their mastheads three professors from the University of Toronto, two of whom had disassociated themselves from the journals in 2014 and 2016, and the third of whom had never agreed to be associated with the journal. After this discovery, the professors' names were removed from the journals.

Indian operations
Pulsus is operating from Chennai, Delhi, Hyderabad and Visakhapatnam providing services in HealthTech, health informatics, medical publishing, and pharmacovigilance services. Pulsus has 5,000 employees.

Pulsus' Visakhapatnam and Chennai offices translate their annual conferences and medical journals' information in local languages such as Telugu, Hindi, Tamil, Bengali.

Pulsus Visakhapatnam has created more women employment since inception, through the campus placements in and around Andhra Pradesh. Taking the inspiration from Narendra Modi, PULSUS employees conducted "Say no to plastic campaign" in association with Software Technology Parks of India and conducted rallies to support Andhra Pradesh Disha act and to secure women employees.

See also
Pulsus Group academic journals

References

External links

Academic publishing companies
Publishing companies of Canada
Publishing companies established in 1984
1984 establishments in Ontario